"Independent" is the first single by Webbie from his second album Savage Life 2. It features Lil Phat and Lil Boosie and a sample of Webbie's "Bad Bitch" in the chorus. Rapper Macklemore would later sample "Independent" on his #1 hit, "Can't Hold Us."

Music video
The music video features Webbie performing in a room with three screens, each of which showcases a classroom filled with young women actively watching a news report covering a presidential press conference on the dire state of the war. As they watch the address, one student begins to visualize herself earning a degree, becoming a doctor, and winning the Nobel Prize. It culminates with the impeachment of the current president and her election as the first female president. After assuming her position, she proclaims her plans towards peace in the Middle East to the class' applause. The video closes with a screen that displays a dedication to Pimp C.

Remix
A remix features Diamond & Princess of Crime Mob. Part 2 to the song features Lil' Boosie & Gorilla Zoe.

Chart performance
On the issue dated December 8, 2007 the single debuted on the US Billboard Hot 100 at number 99. It later peaked at number nine, thus becoming a top 10 hit on the chart. "Independent" is the most successful song for all three artists. It was MTV Jams' first song of the week in 2008.

Charts

Weekly charts

Year-end charts

References

2007 songs
2008 singles
Webbie songs
Lil Boosie songs
Songs written by Webbie
Asylum Records singles